James Mason  (1909–1984) was an English actor.

James, Jim, Jimmy, or Jem Mason may also refer to:

Actors
James Mason (American actor) (1889–1959), character performer from 1910s to 1950s
James Mason (Australian actor), film and television actor

Politicians
James Brown Mason (1775–1819), American legislator from Rhode Island
James Murray Mason (1798–1871), American legislator and diplomat from Virginia
James W. Mason (1841–1875), African-American legislator from Arkansas
James Mason (Canadian politician) (1843–1918), banker, brigadier general and senator
James Mason (British politician) (1861–1929), MP for Windsor, 1906–1918
Jim Mason (Ohio politician), member Ohio House of Representatives, 1993–1998
James Mason (neo-Nazi) (born 1952), American neo-Nazi

Sportspeople

Footballers
Jim Mason (footballer) (before 1875–after 1909), English forward for Burslem Port Vale
Jimmy Mason (footballer, born 1919) (1919–1971), Scottish inside forward for Third Lanark
Jimmy Mason (footballer, born 1933), Scottish midfielder

Other sportspeople
Jem Mason (1816–1866), English jockey; 1839 Grand National winner
James Mason (chess player) (1849–1905), British (Irish) master
James Mason (cricketer) (1876–1938), English player
James Mason (field hockey) (born 1947), Australian player
Jim Mason (baseball) (born 1950), American MLB shortstop
James Mason (golfer) (born 1951), American professional golfer
James Mason (wrestler) (born 1979), ring name of English professional wrestler James Atkins

Other people
James Malcolm Mason (1864–1924), New Zealand doctor and public health administrator
James O. Mason (1930–2019), American Surgeon General and leader in the Church of Jesus Christ of Latter-day Saints
James Cheney Mason (born 1943), American lawyer
James Mason (bishop) (born 1954), Solomon Islander Bishop of Hanuato'o
Jim Mason (activist) (born 1940), American author and animal rights advocate
James Mason (musician), American multi–instrumentalist associated with American vibraphone player Roy Ayers

Other uses
Jim Mason, protagonist portrayed by George Raft in 1939's King of the Turf
James Mason, a GWR 3031 Class British locomotive

Mason, James